Daube glacé is a jellied stew made with seasoned beef and veal stock molded into form. It is served cold as an hors d'oeuvre on crackers or with garlic croutons. It can also be served on French bread with mayonnaise as a kind of po'boy. A traditional dish from New Orleans, it is listed on the Ark of Taste. Daube is a French beef stew.  It is sold at Langenstein's grocery store.

See also

Head cheese

References

Further reading

External links
New York Times recipe

Beef dishes
French cuisine